Gawege is a hamlet in the Dutch municipality of Reimerswaal. The hamlet lies on the road from Krabbendijke to Waarde. The hamlet was mentioned first in 1288.

Gawege is not a statistical entity, and the postal authorities have placed it under Waarde. The hamlet consists of about 30 houses.

References 

Populated places in Zeeland
Reimerswaal (municipality)